The Overland Trail was a Klondike Gold Rush-era transportation route between Whitehorse, Yukon and Dawson City in Yukon, Canada. It was built in 1902 at a cost of CDN$129,000 after the White Pass and Yukon Route railroad won a contract to deliver mail to the Dawson City gold fields from the Canadian government. Before its construction, transportation to Dawson City required a steamboat trip on the Yukon River during the brief subarctic summer, or dog sleds after the rivers had frozen. 

After its construction, horse-drawn stagecoach routes soon were established. Even with this regulated travel, it took five days to travel the distance between the two towns. Sleighs were substituted for coaches once snow began to fall, and passengers were charged CDN$125 for a one-way trip.

The first automobile used the trail in 1912, but soon afterward, declining returns from the gold mines caused the population of Yukon to drop precipitously. In 1921, the White Pass discontinued operating stages on the Overland Trail, and the mail contracts were awarded to other contractors thereafter. In 1922, the mail contractor switched from horse-drawn vehicles to motor vehicles.  In 1955, a new automobile highway was built north from Whitehorse to Mayo, with a spur to Dawson City. This highway made the Overland Trail obsolete, and it fell into disrepair. That road itself was replaced by the Klondike Highway. Today, the Overland Trail is primarily a recreation route for sled dog teams, snowmobiles, and other tourism-related activities. Artifacts relating to the Gold Rush-era use of the trail are plentiful along the route, which is used in February as part of the Yukon Quest, a 1,000-mile sled dog race between Whitehorse and Fairbanks, Alaska.

White Pass & Yukon Route Overland Trail Equipment, 1901-1921

Studebaker Bros. Mfg. Co. made Sensible™ bobs.  B. F. & H. L. Sweet made Common Sense™ bobs.  Weber Wagon Co. made Good Sense™ bobs.  Weber sold out to International Harvester Co. in 1904.

For the roster of White Pass boats, see, List of steamboats on the Yukon River.

For the roster of White Pass railroad equipment, see, List of White Pass and Yukon Route locomotives and cars.

Notes

References 
Killick, Adam. Racing the White Silence: On the trail of the Yukon Quest. Penguin Global, May 2005.
Webb, Melody. Yukon: The Last Frontier. UBC Press, 1993.
White Pass & Yukon Ry. Directors’ Report to the 30th June (1901-1914), Univ. of Missouri-St. Louis Mercantile Library, St. Louis, Missouri.
White Pass and Yukon Route Comptroller’s Special Report, for years 1902-1949 (privately held).
Equipment [WP&YR] Mail Service Department as of February 1, 1905 (privately held).
“Winter Mail Service,” 1 The Dawson Record, No. 23 (Aug. 11, 1903), at page 1.

Historic trails and roads in Canada
Roads in Yukon
History of Yukon
Gold rush trails and roads
Buildings and structures completed in 1902
1902 in transport